The Tailevu Knights is a Fijian former rugby union team that had a franchise area coverering Tailevu, Northland, and Rewa.The team played in Fiji's premier competition the Colonial Cup from 2004 to 2008 before the competition ceased in 2008.

History
The franchise was one of four original teams created for the inaugural Colonial Cup in 2004.

Coaching team
 Coach: Iosefo Bele
 Team manager: Opetaia Ravai
 Captain: Isaac Mow

The Team
15 Malakai Bakaniceva
14 Epeli Ruivadra
13 Fero Tabaki
12 Isaac Mow (capt)
11 Maleli Bula
10 Luke Rogoyawa
9 Netani Koroi
8 Romuluse Ratukana
7 Viliame Maya
6 Peni Tora
5 Kevurieli Bulivorovoro
4 Langi Peters
3 Mosese Sela
2 Vereniki Sauturaga
1 Isei Colati

External links
Tailevu Knights

Defunct Fijian rugby union teams
Colonial Cup (rugby union) teams